Mohammad Masum (born 5 July 1987) is a Bangladeshi cricketer. He made his List A debut for Khelaghar Samaj Kallyan Samity in the Dhaka Premier Division Cricket League on 22 September 2013.

References

External links
 

1987 births
Living people
Bangladeshi cricketers
Khelaghar Samaj Kallyan Samity cricketers
People from Khulna